Leptospermum micromyrtus is a species of spreading shrub that is endemic to higher areas of south-eastern Australia. It has broad, egg-shaped leaves with the narrower end towards the base, white flowers and fruit that remain on the plant at maturity.

Description
It has papery bark tending to rough and peeling in flakes. There are broad reddish brown bracts at the base of the flower bud but which fall off as the flower opens.

Taxonomy and naming
Leptospermum micromyrtus was first formally described in 1856 by Friedrich Anton Wilhelm Miquel in the journal Nederlandsch Kruidkundig Archief from a specimen collected by Ferdinand von Mueller on "Mount Aberdeen" (an old name for Mount Buffalo). The specific epithet (micromyrtus) is derived from the ancient Greek word mikros and the genus name Myrtus.

Distribution and habitat
Button tea-tree grows on steep, windswept, rocky slopes south from the Brindabella Range in New South Wales to scattered mountain summits in Victoria, including Mount Buffalo and Mount Cobberas.

References

micromyrtus
Flora of New South Wales
Flora of Victoria (Australia)
Myrtales of Australia
Plants described in 1856